Bedgebury Cross is a hamlet in the civil parish of Goudhurst. It is  located, in the Bedgebury Forest area of Kent, England. It is located on the B2079 road connecting Goudhurst with the A21 road at Flimwell. The term "cross" refers to a wayside cross that originally existed at this site, this cross is replicated in the brickwork of the chimney of one of the cottages. Presumably the chimney was built over roughly the site of the cross.

Probably the most well-known Bedgeburian is Thomas Culpeper (c. 1514–1541), the lover of Queen Catherine Howard, who was King Henry VIII's fifth wife. Culpeper and Howard were both executed when the affair became known.

References

Civil parishes in Kent
Villages in Kent